...Last the Evening is the third solo studio album by the American artist Carrie Akre.

Track listing
Courage - 4:20
Last the Evening - 3:56
Half Shelf Life - 4:00
Take My Heart - 4:24
Stupid Is - 3:45
Breathe - 4:19
Hide a Lie - 3:18
Trafalgar Square - 3:25
Halo - 4:01
Back & Forth - 4:06
Secret - 7:03

Personnel
Carrie Akre - vocals, guitar, keyboards
Jared Clifton - guitar
Danny Newcomb - guitar
Mark Pickerel - drums, percussion
Johnny Sangster - bass, guitar

External links

References

2007 albums
Carrie Akre albums
Albums produced by Steve Fisk